Labeo kibimbi is fish in genus Labeo from the upper Lualaba and Lake Tanganyika in the Democratic Republic of the Congo.

References 

kibimbi
Fish of Lake Tanganyika
Fish described in 1949
Endemic fauna of the Democratic Republic of the Congo